The Producers Guild of America Milestone Award is awarded annually by the Producers Guild of America (PGA) at the Producers Guild Awards ceremonies. It is referred to as the Producers Guild's "most prestigious honor, recognizing an individual or team who has made historic contributions to the entertainment industry."

Award recipients
The following producers have received the award.

8th: Terry Semel
9th: Bob Daly
10th: Steven Spielberg
11th: not awarded
12th: Kirk Douglas
13th: Robert Wise
14th: Jack Valenti
15th: Warren Beatty
16th: Jeffrey Katzenberg
17th: Clint Eastwood
18th: Ronald Meyer
19th: Alan F. Horn
20th: Brian  Grazer and Ron Howard
21st: Michael Lynton and Amy Pascal
22nd: James Cameron
23rd: Leslie Moonves
24th: Harvey Weinstein and Bob Weinstein
25th: Bob Iger
26th: Jon Feltheimer
27th: Jim Gianopulos
28th: Tom Rothman
29th: Donna Langley
30th: Toby Emmerich
31st: Ted Sarandos
32nd: not awarded
33rd: George Lucas and Kathleen Kennedy

References

Milestone Award